Waruq (Quechua waru basket or platform of a rope bridge to cross rivers / stony ground or place, precious stones, heaping, stone heap, -q a suffix,  hispanicized spellings Huaroc, Huaroj) is an archaeological site in Peru. It is situated in the Huánuco Region, Yarowilca Province, Chavinillo District

See also 
 T'akaq

References 

Archaeological sites in Huánuco Region
Archaeological sites in Peru